Contaminated groundwater in the Central Valley of California, is a growing problem, due to contamination and overuse. This problem is compounded by the overdrafting of underground aquifers.

Currently, nitrates are the most abundant pollutants in the Central Valley due to the copious amounts of agricultural runoff from the farms in the valley. The concentration of naturally occurring arsenic is also an issue.

This is a public health concern as groundwater is often the primary water source in the region.

Near-term solutions to reduce the pollution and overuse are often costly and hard to implement in a timely manner.

Background 

At the heart of this industry lies the Central Valley, a vital agricultural hub for the state and country. Consisting of both the San Joaquin Valley and Sacramento Valley, the Central Valley has an estimated two thirds of the state’s cropland with 7 million acres. California is also the leading dairy producer in the country, with 1.8 million mature cows in the Central Valley contributing to 80% of California’s dairies. In this crucial high-output agricultural region that often suffers from drought, water quantity and quality have been a leading concern.

History 

Groundwater has been pumped in the valley since 1850, when residents began to build pumps to help make up for the lack of surface water in the area. At the turn of the 20th century, California became as a leading agricultural producer due to its technological advances in land management, irrigation and machinery. The Central Valley had ideal economic and climate conditions for many crops and drew in wealthy landowners.

Aquifers are extremely important because groundwater supplies much of the water needed for agricultural purposes and serves as the only source of water for several communities throughout the valley. However, reciprocal rainfall is not always available to recharge the aquifers and recent years have seen an increase in drying wells. This overdraft of groundwater causes numerous problems for farmers and is only made worse by climate change. Throughout the early 1900s, technology for waste management did not advance at the same speed as the growth in agriculture. Issues in groundwater contamination by nitrates comes from 50 years of unregulated management of livestock waste disposal, septic systems and commercial fertilizers. The California Sustainable Groundwater Management Act of 2014 was the first to specify how to manage groundwater in a way that would not harm or endanger future access to clean groundwater.

Before this act, no regulations governed groundwater management other than the federal Safe Drinking Water Act and Clean Water Act. These acts do not totally protect Central Valley residents. Consistent monitoring didn’t begin until the 1950s, with only 13,000 tests completed in the 1980s compared to the over 133,329 tests in the Central Valley region conducted by the California Spatio Temporal Information on Nitrate in Groundwater (CASTING) database. With advances in testing and research, organizations and residents of the Central Valley have increased efforts to reduce the impact of nitrate water pollution, expected to drastically increase in the next couple decades.

Regulations and standards 
Set by the California Department of Public Health, the maximum contaminant level for nitrates, in CCR §63341, is 45 milligrams per liter (mg/L) for nitrate as NO3 (equivalent to 10 mg/L for nitrate as nitrogen or “N”); 10 mg/L for nitrate plus nitrite as N; and 1 mg/L for nitrite as N. Public wells are required to test their water annually, and submit the results to the Department of Health, but private wells are not required to do so. A documented 98% of the state has access to drinkable water, though some studies note that there are disparities in access.

Despite modern data and methods for agricultural safety, 92 water systems in the Central Valley were attached to wells containing illegal levels of nitrates between 2005 and 2008, impacting the 1,335,000 residents in the area.  Historically, programs to identify and address the impact nitrates have on communities and industries have run at around $1 million each.

The Californian Sustainable Groundwater Management Act of 2014 was the first of its kind to specify how to manage groundwater in a way that would not harm or endanger future generations' access to clean groundwater. Signed by Gov. Jerry Brown in 2014, this three-bill legislative package created a framework for preserving and managing groundwater at the local and state level. This creates a regulatory process mandating that Groundwater Sustainability Agencies (GSAs) to adopt Ground Water Sustainability Plans (GSPs) to manage supply. Before this act, regulations existed only at the federal level with the Safe Drinking Water Act and the Clean Water Act, which failed to protect Central Valley residents. Based on these laws, farms and oil drilling sites could not dump waste into the ground if it impacted clean drinking water; however, if the water was not suitable to drink, consumers and businesses could dump waste freely into the water, limiting access to drinking water by further contaminating sources already deemed undrinkable.

Sources of nitrogen 
Manure, fertilizer and septic waste are the leading sources of nitrates in groundwater. Manure produces around 6.5 million tons of nitrogen, which, when not handled properly or with improper drainage methods, can contaminate soil and water sources. Nitrogen-based soil compounds produced by crops such as legumes, are consistently a minimal source. Fertilizers add roughly 11.5 million tons of nitrogen annually in the United States. Nitrogen in fertilizers is converted to nitrates, which is the main form of nitrogen in wastewater. Nitrogen from fertilizers can also be released into the atmosphere as ammonia gas, commonly recognized as a greenhouse gas. In the U.S. 53% of nitrates originate from fertilizers, making this a priority for Californian officials.

Population impact 

Several studies have investigated the impact of nitrogen-based wastes such as nitrates on human health. Some studies suggest that exposure to such wastes is correlated to an increased risk of cancer. A determining factor in increased risk consistent through all of the studies is the exposure period. In cases where the incidence of cancer was found to be significantly higher, the exposure period was at least five and in some cases ten years. Women who consume water with nitrates over 5 mg/L are at a higher risk of thyroid cancer. This 5 mg/L level is 5 mg below the federally accepted limit. When consumed, nitrate competes with iodine in the body to be taken up by the thyroid. When the thyroid takes up nitrogen instead of iodine, the thyroid begins to lose function. Only five years of this exposure significantly increases the risk of thyroid cancer. A higher risk of colon and rectal cancer also accompanies consumption of water with nitrate levels above 5 mg/L. Exposure for 10+ years is associated with increased colon cancer risk in susceptible populations. Populations affected may also lack access to fresh fruits and vegetables, and a lack of vitamin C is a major risk factor for colorectal cancers. Drinking water and consuming dietary sources of nitrates/nitrites are speculated to cause increased cancer risks when the nitrate compounds react with amines and amides to form carcinogens. The exact process of how this happens is still being researched.

References

Central Valley (California)
Water in California
Environmental issues in California